is a railway station on the Gotemba Line in the eastern part of the city of Gotemba, Shizuoka, Japan, operated by Central Japan Railway Company (JR Central). It is one of the gateway stations to Mount Fuji and the Fuji Five Lakes (including Lake Kawaguchi and Lake Yamanaka).

Lines
The limited express train Mt. Fuji runs between Shinjuku (Tokyo) and this station via Matsuda.

Station layout
Gotemba Station has a single side platform and a single island platform serving three tracks. The station building has automated ticket machines, IC card TOICA automated turnstiles, and a staffed ticket office. The station building is elevated above the platforms.

Platforms

History

Along with its division and privatization of JNR on April 1, 1987, the station came under the control and operation of the Central Japan Railway Company.

Station numbering was introduced to the Gotemba Line in March 2018; Gotemba Station was assigned station number CB10.

Passenger statistics
In fiscal 2017, the station was used by an average of 4879 passengers daily (boarding passengers only).

Surrounding area
Gotemba Minami High School
Gotemba High School

Bus terminals
Bus tickets can be bought at Bus Information on each side. "Hakone Free Pass" (excursion ticket) can be bought at Tourist Information on Hakone Otome side.
Mount Fuji side
for Kawaguchiko Station (Lake Kawaguchi) via Mt. Fuji Station (Fujikyuko Line) and Lake Yamanaka, by Fujikyu Bus
for  Mount Fuji 5th stage and Camp Fuji (USMC), by Fujikyu Bus
for Ten-yu via Miyagino, Gora Station, Hakone Open-Air Museum and Yunessun, by Hakone Tozan Bus (afternoon)
for Yokohama Station, by Fuji Express and Sotetsu Bus
for Kyōto Station, Ōsaka Station, Namba Station, and Ōsaka Abenobashi Station, by Fujikyu Shonan Bus and Kintetsu Bus
Hakone Otome side
for Gotemba Premium Outlets, by Free Shuttle Bus
for Hakone Area (Togendai (Lake Ashi)) via Otome Toge and Sengoku (transfer for Gora Station, Miyanoshita, Hakone Yumoto Station, and Odawara Station), by Odakyu Hakone Highway Bus
for Ten-yu via Miyagino, Gora Station, Hakone Open-Air Museum and Yunessun, by Hakone Tozan Bus (before noon)
for Shinjuku Station (in Tokyo) via Tōmei-Gotemba (transfer for Tōmei Expressway Bus for JR Shizuoka Station and JR Nagoya Station), by Odakyu Hakone Highway Bus
for Haneda Airport via JR Yokohama Station, by Odakyu Hakone Highway Bus (joint operation with Keikyu Bus)

See also
 List of railway stations in Japan

References

External links

 Gotemba Station information (JR Central) 
 Train Timetable for Matsuda (transfer for Shinjuku and Odawara via Odakyu Line), Kozu, Yokohama and Tokyo direction (JR Central) 
 Train Timetable for Numazu, Mishima (transfer for Shinkansen) and Shizuoka direction (JR Central) 

Railway stations in Japan opened in 1889
Railway stations in Shizuoka Prefecture
Gotemba Line
Stations of Central Japan Railway Company
Gotemba, Shizuoka